is the Latin name under which the "Lamb of God" is honoured within the Catholic Mass and other Christian liturgies descending from the Latin liturgical tradition. It is the name given to a specific prayer that occurs in these liturgies, and is the name given to the music pieces that accompany the text of this prayer.

Liturgical usage

Latin Catholic 
The Syrian custom of a chant addressed to the Lamb of God was introduced into the Roman Rite Mass by Pope Sergius I (687–701) in the context of his rejection of the Council of Trullo of 692 (which was well received in the Byzantine East), whose canons had forbidden the iconographic depiction of Christ as a lamb instead of a man.

The verse used in the first and second invocations may be repeated as many times as necessary whilst the celebrant prepares the host and wine for communion.

In a Tridentine Requiem Mass, the words "" are replaced by "" (grant them rest), while "" is replaced by "" (grant them eternal rest).

The priest uses the phrase "Lamb of God" again, later in the Mass. While displaying the Eucharistic species to the people before giving them Holy Communion, he says: "" ("Behold the Lamb of God, behold Him who takes away the sins of the world. Blessed are those called to the supper of the Lamb.")

Anglican 

The following instances are found in the Church of England's Book of Common Prayer:

From "The Litany":

From "Holy Communion":
 

The following versions are found in Common Worship, the alternative Anglican liturgical resources, and also in the Episcopal Church's liturgical resources:

Lutheran 

The version found in the Lutheran Service Book of the Lutheran Church–Missouri Synod is:

Musical settings

Religious music 

Here are some examples:

 Machaut's 
 Bach's Mass in B minor
 Beethoven's 
 Karl Jenkins' The Armed Man -  a mass for peace
 Schubert's Mass No. 2
 Bob Chilcott's Little Jazz Mass
 Ralph Vaughan Williams's Mass in G minor

Such settings include:
 Mozart's Requiem
 Verdi's Requiem
 Fauré's Requiem
 Rutter's Requiem
 Penderecki’s Polish Requiem
 Britten's War Requiem, in which the text is interleaved with Wilfred Owen's poem "At a Calvary near the Ancre"

Some composers set the text as an independent movement, such as Samuel Barber, who wrote a version combining the text with the music of his Adagio for Strings, sung a cappella.

In popular culture 

Outside of religious use, the text has been used by composers such as:

 Elliot Goldenthal for Alien 3
 Keiki Kobayashi for Ace Combat 04: Shattered Skies
 Elitsa Alexandrova for Assassin's Creed Rogue
 Enya for the song "Trains and Winter Rains"
 Halsey for the song Castle
 Kuroshitsuji (Black Butler) soundtrack for episodes 17 and 18
 Jon Bellion for Ooh
 New Age Worldbeat group Enigma (German band) for the song Agnus Dei
 Rufus Wainright for the song Agnus Dei from the album Want Two
 Mylène Farmer "Agnus Dei" (1991)

References 

Christian liturgical music
Latin religious words and phrases
Order of Mass